Brad Silverberg is an American computer scientist and businessman, most noted for his work at Microsoft in 1990–1999 as Senior VP and product manager for MS-DOS, Windows, Internet Explorer, and Office. He was named PC Magazines Person of the Year in 1995 for his leadership of Windows 95.

Early career
Silverberg earned a BS degree magna cum laude in Computer Science from Brown University, and an MS in Computer Science from University of Toronto. His first work experience was research at SRI International, one of the four first ARPANET nodes. Also early in his career Silverberg worked in the early 1980s at Apple Computer on the failed Lisa project.

Later Silverberg was hired as the first employee at Analytica, a Silicon Valley startup. After 1985, he was VP of Engineering at Borland after their acquisition of Analytica.

Career at Microsoft
In 1990, Silverberg left Borland to lead the personal systems division at Microsoft.  A number of people left Borland to follow him at Microsoft in the following years, leading to a number of failed lawsuits from Borland.

At the start of his tenure, the personal systems division was already a prime moneymaker with MS-DOS, at that time sold only through OEMs. After shipping Windows 95, he turned his full-time focus onto the Internet efforts at Microsoft, which led to the creation of the Internet Platform and Tools Division 1996, which he led.

In 1997, Silverberg was given responsibilities for Office but his principal interest remained with the Internet. He took a sabbatical that summer to reflect on where the Internet was going at Microsoft. He returned as a part-time consultant for new president and later CEO, Steve Ballmer. On 29 October 1999, he left Microsoft.

Current career
In March 2000, he led a group of former Microsoft executives to found Ignition, a venture capital firm. Silverberg works as a partner of the firm.

References

External links
 Ignition: Brad Silverberg biography 

Microsoft employees
Living people
Year of birth missing (living people)
Brown University alumni
University of Toronto alumni